Francini is a surname. Notable people with the surname include:

Enrique Mario Francini (1916–1978), Argentine tango violinist
Giovanni Francini (born 1963), retired Italian footballer
Loris Francini (born 1962), San Marinese politician
Sebastián Francini (born 1989), Argentine actor
Tommaso Francini (1571–1651), Florentine hydraulics engineer and garden designer

See also
42929 Francini, main belt asteroid with an orbital period of 3.7 years